Zondoma is one of the 45 provinces of Burkina Faso, located in its Nord Region. In 2019 the population was 239,955. Its capital is Gourcy.

Education
In 2011 the province had 191 primary schools and 16 secondary schools.

Healthcare
In 2011 the province had 25 health and social promotion centers (Centres de santé et de promotion sociale), 3 doctors and 57 nurses.

Departments
Zondoma is divided into 5 departments:

References

See also
Regions of Burkina Faso
Provinces of Burkina Faso
Departments of Burkina Faso

 
Provinces of Burkina Faso